Gerald Otieno Kajwang (15 July 1956 – 19 November 2014) was a Kenyan politician. He belonged to the Orange Democratic Movement and was elected to represent the Mbita Constituency in the National Assembly of Kenya in the December 2007 parliamentary election. In the bitterly contested 2013 elections, Otieno Kajwang was elected to represent Homa Bay County in the Senate of Kenya. Upon his death, his brother, Moses Otieno Kajwang won the election to succeed him in Parliament, representing Homa Bay.

Kajwang died on 19 November 2014 at Mater hospital after suffering cardiac arrest. His other brother, Tom Joseph Kajwang, also serves as an MP, representing Ruaraka.

References

External links
 Hon. Gerald Otieno Kajwang memorial

1959 births
2014 deaths
Members of the Senate of Kenya
20th-century Kenyan lawyers
Orange Democratic Movement politicians
Members of the National Assembly (Kenya)
Makerere University alumni